Andrew Steyn Kuhn (born ) is a South African rugby union player who last played for the  in the Currie Cup and the  in the Rugby Challenge in 2017. His regular position is prop or hooker. He has been playing for Slava Moscow since 2019.

References

South African rugby union players
Living people
1997 births
People from Oudtshoorn
Rugby union props
Rugby union hookers
Doping cases in rugby union
Free State Cheetahs players
Griquas (rugby union) players
Slava Moscow players
Rugby union players from the Western Cape